The County of Plantagenet is one of the lands administrative divisions of Queensland that has existed since 1901.  The county is divided into civil  parishes. It is located in the Central Highlands Region of Central Queensland.

Parishes
It contains the following parishes:

References

Plantagenet